is an open-air architectural park in Takamatsu, Kagawa Prefecture, Japan. It houses over twenty buildings from around Shikoku dating from the Edo period through to the Taishō period, four of which have been designated Important Cultural Properties. The park opened in 1976 and covers an area of approximately fifty thousand square metres.

Important Cultural Properties
  (18th Century)
  (1781)
  (1909)
  (Meiji period)

Gallery
An exhibition space designed by Tadao Ando opened in 2002.

See also

Meiji Mura
Minka
Japanese architecture

References

External links
 Shikoku Mura homepage

Open-air museums in Japan
Museums in Kagawa Prefecture
Shikoku region
Tadao Ando buildings
Parks and gardens in Kagawa Prefecture
Important Cultural Properties of Japan